The following is a list of official matches played by Turkmenistan national football team throughout its history.

Matches

1992

1994

1996

1997

1998

1999

2000

2001

2003

2004

2005

2007

2008

2009

2010

2011

2012

2013

2014

2015

2016

2017

2018

2019

2021

2022

References 

Results